"The Kids" was the 81st episode of the M*A*S*H television series, and the ninth of season four. The episode aired on October 31, 1975.

Plot

Nurse Cratty's orphanage is evacuated due to shelling, and Cratty and the children stay with the 4077th.  Arriving at the camp, the children, in groups of two or three, are billeted in the tents alongside the 4077th staff.  Frank Burns is not happy with the disruption, fearing for the security of his Purple Heart, awarded after he received a 'shell fragment' in his eye (an eggshell fragment from a boiled egg rather than an explosive device).

B.J. tells the orphans staying in the Swamp a bedtime story of Androcles and the Lion.  They're asleep before he finishes the tale, but Hawkeye insists B.J. finish the story.  Colonel Potter's bedtime story to his charges is taken directly from a gun maintenance manual.  A girl bedding down in the officer's club would rather play the piano than sleep.

The last person from the orphanage to arrive is a young heavily pregnant woman whom Nurse Cratty was caring for, who stops en route to visit her in-laws.  She arrives at the camp late at night, collapsing, having been shot.  The doctors operate to save her life and deliver her baby.  As they both recover in post-op, Hawkeye and B.J. award the baby with Frank's Purple Heart.

After a few days it's safe for Nurse Cratty and the children to return.  As the staff are saying their goodbyes to the children, Radar is looking for one boy in particular—to retrieve his teddy bear from him.  He gives the boy a substitute teddy bear instead.

Notes
This is the second of two appearances by the character of Nurse Cratty.  She was featured in the season 2 episode "The Trial of Henry Blake", where she was played by Hope Summers. In this episode, Nurse Cratty is played by Ann Doran.

External links

M*A*S*H (season 4) episodes
1975 American television episodes
Television episodes directed by Alan Alda